The 2016 Rugby Borough Council election took place on 5 May 2016 to elect members of Rugby Borough Council in England. This was on the same day as other local elections.

References

2016 English local elections
2016
2010s in Warwickshire